Zeynabi (also Romanized as Zeynabī; also known as Zainubi and Zeynūbī) is a village in Ramkan Rural District, in the Central District of Qeshm County, Hormozgan Province, Iran. At the 2006 census, its population was 1,207, in 277 families.

References 

Populated places in Qeshm County